Leça Futebol Clube, better known as Leça FC or simply Leça, is a Portuguese football club located in the town of Leça da Palmeira, Matosinhos. Founded in 1912, it had a spell in the top-flight Primeira Liga between 1995 and 1998, when it was relegated for financial irregularities. They currently play in the Campeonato de Portugal. The club currently play their home games at the Estádio do Leça FC, which holds a capacity of 12,000 spectators. The current chairman is António Pinho and their current manager is João Crespo. The club's shirt and socks are white while their shorts are green.

History
Founded in 1912, Leca participated in the Portuguese Liga from 1995 to 1998 but a decision taken by the Portuguese Football Federation based on past acts of corruption decided to relegate Leça to the Liga de Honra for 1998–99 season. The team was expected to fight for promotion but the efforts were not enough to bring the team to the top level again. In the upcoming years, the club was affected by financial problems that cut some of the desire of wanting the team back to the top. Because of the team's lower budget, new goals were set. The main goal was now to make the club financially secure and then try to put the team back on the first division.

However, after a series of events of bad management of the financial status by the presidents, it has been related that some of the presidents stole money from the club to use for their own benefit, which was unpaid wages to the team professionals, unqualified team coaches and other sporting factors. Since then, they've been dubbed as strong candidates to promotion but never confirmed the expectations, finishing in mid-table and surprisingly sometimes near the bottom of the table.

Badge
The club's badge is in green and white, the club colours. The castle on top of it represents Leça da Palmeira, the city which the club was in on its foundation in 1912.

Stadium
Leça play their games at the Estádio do Leça FC. The current stadium has played host to many matches down the years in the Portuguese Liga or in the Liga de Honra. It currently has a capacity of 12,000 spectators and has two big stands in green and white which symbolizes the club's colours. The stands also feature the name of the club on both sides of the pitch. The club built the stadium in 1992 as Leça were ready to go into the top flight of Portuguese football.

Honours
 Segunda Liga
Winners (1): 1994–95

 Segunda Divisão
Winners (1): 1940–41

 Terceira Divisão
Winners (1): 2006–07

League Cup and History
As of April 14, 2009

Current squad

Former players

  Wesley John - Saint Vincent and the Grenadines international who played in Portugal for 23 years, including for clubs Ribeira Brava and Porto da Cruz, both below the Portuguese fourth tier)

External links
Squad at Zerozero

 
Association football clubs established in 1912
Football clubs in Portugal
1912 establishments in Portugal
Primeira Liga clubs
Liga Portugal 2 clubs